František Fadrhonc (18 December 1914 – 9 October 1981) was a Czech football manager, who was born in Nymburk, Austria-Hungary, present day Czech Republic. He coached many teams in Europe, mostly in the Netherlands. After winning the Dutch championship with Willem II Tilburg in 1952 and 1955, he coached SC Enschede and Go Ahead Eagles.

In 1970, he took over the Netherlands national team and was their coach as they qualified for the 1974 FIFA World Cup, besting, among others, their rivals Belgium. However, it was Rinus Michels who took over in 1974 and who led them in the finals of that tournament.

Fadrhonc left the Netherlands for Greece to coach AEK Athens in the 1975–76 football season. He stayed until 1977. During that period, he led AEK to the semi-finals of the UEFA Cup in the 1977.

In the UEFA Cup campaign of the 1976–77 season, he is credited with the substitution of regular goalkeeper Lakis Stergioudas with veteran Nikos Christidis in extra-time of the second leg of the encounter against QPR. His move was justified when Christidis stopped two penalties and AEK went through to the semi finals. He died aged 66 in Nicosia, Cyprus.

References

1914 births
1981 deaths
People from Nymburk
Sportspeople from the Central Bohemian Region
Czech football managers
Willem II (football club) managers
Go Ahead Eagles managers
Netherlands national football team managers
AEK Athens F.C. managers
Czechoslovak football managers
Panachaiki F.C. managers
Keravnos Strovolou FC managers
Czech expatriate football managers
Czech expatriate sportspeople in the Netherlands
Expatriate football managers in the Netherlands
Czech expatriate sportspeople in Greece
Expatriate football managers in Greece
Czech expatriate sportspeople in Cyprus
Expatriate football managers in Cyprus